Andrei Stocker (born 22 November 1942) is a Romanian former footballer who played as a central defender and a referee.

Career
Andrei Stocker, nicknamed "Keke" was born on 22 November 1942 in Aninoasa, his parents being Transylvanian Saxon miners, who because of their German origins were deported in 1945 by the soviets to do forced labour for a few years in the Donbas region. He started playing football at Minerul Aninoasa where he was noticed by coach Eugen Mladin who brought him at his team, Jiul Petroșani. In his first season played at Jiul, he helped the team gain promotion to Divizia A, a competition in which he made his debut on 21 August 1966 in a 7–0 victory against Steagul Roșu Brașov. After playing one year and a half at Jiul Petroșani as a right midfielder, Stocker started to play alongside Gogu Tonca in the central defense, where they became known for their tough way of playing, being considered by some as the most aggressive couple of defenders in Divizia A's history. He appeared in 271 Divizia A matches and scored 8 goals for Jiul, played two Cupa României finals, winning one and made two appearances in the double against Dundee United in the 1974–75 European Cup Winners' Cup which was lost with 3–2 on aggregate. In 1976, Stocker went to play at Minerul Lupeni where he ended his career after one year.

After he retired from his playing career, Stocker was a referee, arbitrating in Divizia C and being a linesman in Divizia B and Divizia A. In 1986, he emigrated to Sweden where he settled in the city of Malmö with his family.

Honours
Jiul Petroșani
Divizia B: 1965–66
Cupa României: 1973–74, runner-up 1971–72

Notes

References

1942 births
Living people
Romanian footballers
Association football defenders
Liga I players
Liga II players
CSM Jiul Petroșani players
CS Minerul Lupeni players
Romanian football referees
Transylvanian Saxon people